Brine Leas School is an academy school in Nantwich, Cheshire, England. The school has 1,287 pupils enrolled, and has technology and language status.

The school opened in 1977 as a comprehensive co-educational establishment. The first head teacher was Daphne Howard; on her retirement kyle Butler became head teacher. Frank Cliffe became the school's third head teacher in September 2007. In September 2010, the school became one of just 32 to take up academy status. In 2011, the school received a capital grant of over £1 million to improve facilities around the site. The school operates a house system, with every pupil and staff member in either "Audley" (with red theme), "Lovell" (green), or "Warwick" (yellow) - Audley being consistent winners of the ‘House Cup’ for several years as of 2010. For the last 2 years the school has been oversubscribed although it does continue to take pupils on distance criteria.

The 2008 Ofsted inspection outlined the school as having outstanding overall effectiveness, with constantly exceptional pupil achievement.  Since the school was inspected results have improved yet further with headlines for five A*to C including English and maths consistently being around 70%.

The school opened a sixth form in September 2010. In 2016, the school became part of the Brine Multi Academy Trust.

Notable alumni
 Bryony Page, trampoline silver medal at 2016 Olympics
Sam Retford, actor who stars on Channel 4 drama Ackley Bridge
 Laura Smith Member of Parliament (MP) for Crewe and Nantwich between 2017 and 2019
 Blitz Kids, an alternative rock band from Nantwich and Crewe
 AJ Pritchard, dancer and television personality
https://assets.publishing.service.gov.uk/government/uploads/system/uploads/attachment_data/file/1118169/_OFFICIAL_SENSITIVE__Boulton_Dan_SoS_Decision.pdf

References

Nantwich
Academies in the Borough of Cheshire East
Secondary schools in the Borough of Cheshire East
People educated at Brine Leas School